Union was launched in Philadelphia in 1774. She sailed between England, North America, and the West Indies. She made one voyage as a slave ship and then returned to her previous trade. A privateer captured her in 1781. 

Slave voyage (1775–1776): Captain William Hamilton sailed from London on 8 September 1775, bound for West Africa. Union acquired her slaves first at the Sierra Leone estuary and then at the Îles de Los. Union departed Africa on 14 November, reached Grenada, and then sailed for Jamaica on 12 December. She arrived at Jamaica and then returned to London on 9 July 1776.

Union first appeared in Lloyd's Register (LR) in 1776.

On 12 June 1878 Captain William Hamilton acquired a letter of marque. On the letter Hamilton declared that Union was carrying provisions for His Majesty's forces.

Loss: Lloyd's List reported on 3 August 1781 that Union, late Hamilton, had been taken and carried into Hispaniola. She had been sailing from Charles-town to Jamaica.

Citations

1774 ships
Ships built in Philadelphia
Age of Sail merchant ships of England
London slave ships
Captured ships